La Intrusa is a Venezuelan telenovela produced by Radio Caracas Televisión in 1986. Based on a story written by Inés Rodena, it is a remake of the 1971 telenovela La usurpadora which starred Marina Baura and Raul Amundaray with the new version being written by Ana Mercedes Escámez, Benilde Ávila and Zaret Romero.

Mariela Alcalá played the dual role of twins Virginia and Estrella accompanied by Víctor Cámara as the male protagonist.

Cast
Mariela Alcalá as Virginia Pérez / Estrella Mendoza De Rossi
Víctor Cámara as Luis Antonio Rossi
Franklin Virgüez as Manuel Landaeta
Rosita Quintana as Renata Rossi
Carmen Julia Alvarez as Ana Julia Rossi
Maricarmen Regueiro as Rosa
Carlos Camara Jr. as Mario Rossi
Flavio Caballero as Freddy
Carlos Marquez as Alexis Pereira
Gledys Ibarra as Belinda
Jonathan Montenegro as Andres
Tomás Henríquez as Guillermo Montesinos
Dante Carlé as Tulipano Morante
María del Pilar as Juana Landaeta
Carolina López as Susy Villamolino
Humberto García as Marcos Fierro
Willie Colón as Himself

References

External links

Opening Credits

1987 telenovelas
RCTV telenovelas
Venezuelan telenovelas
1987 Venezuelan television series debuts
1987 Venezuelan television series endings
Spanish-language telenovelas
Television shows set in Venezuela
Television series about twins